"Kann denn Liebe Sünde sein?" ("Can Love Be a Sin?") is a song by German Neue Deutsche Härte band Eisbrecher. It was released exclusively in Germany on 18 July 2008, as a single from their album Sünde. The song so far is the band's most successful, as it hit the German Alternative Charts at No. 3.

Track listing 
 "Kann denn Liebe Sünde sein" ("Can Love Be a Sin?") - 4:51
 "Herzdieb" ("Heart Thief") - 4:27
 "Kann denn Liebe Sünde sein? ([:SITD:] Remix)" - 4:04

2008 singles
Eisbrecher songs
2008 songs
Songs written by Noel Pix
Songs written by Alexander Wesselsky